Mount Carmel Catholic College (abbreviated as MCCC) is a systemic Catholic co-educational secondary school of the Marist tradition located in Varroville, a suburb 46 kilometres south-west of Sydney. It is situated within the city of Campbelltown, New South Wales, Australia. The current principal is Stephen Lo Cascio.

Mount Carmel is a member of the Macarthur Independent Schools Association (MISA) and the Association of Marist Schools of Australia.

History
Mount Carmel Catholic College was first initiated in 1983/84 by a committee of parishioners located in Ingleburn and Macquarie Fields. The goal of this committee was to establish a Catholic secondary school for the northern part of the Macarthur region. The submission for the school was put to Bishop Murray who was the Bishop of Wollongong at the time. After negotiations with the Carmelite Fathers the site was chosen in Varroville near St Andrews Road and Spitfire Drive.

The first 145 students of the school commenced their education in 1985 at John Therry Catholic High School in Rosemeadow. In September that year, the Commonwealth Government allocated a capital grant, which began Stage 1 of construction.

In 1986, 292 students from Years 7 to 8 were therefore able to begin studies at the main site in Varroville. The principal at this time was Brother Clarence Cunningham. In 1990/91, Brother Clarence stepped down as principal and Brother Neville Solomon was appointed. In this time, the construction of the Champagnat Centre began. In 1996/97, Brother Neville stepped down as principal and Brother Roger Burke became the new principal. By 1998, construction work had begun on new extensions to the site, and this was completed in 1999.

In 2002, John Barrington became the first lay principal of Mount Carmel. In 2007 the new Administration building was completed. In 2012, Wayne Marshall was appointed as the second lay Principal at Mount Carmel. Following a federal building grant, construction on the La Valla Trades Skills Centre began in 2014. In 2015, Mount Carmel Catholic High School was officially renamed Mount Carmel Catholic College and celebrated 30 years since its establishment in 1985.

In 2018, Stephen Lo Cascio commenced as the third lay Principal at Mount Carmel.

Academics
Mount Carmel has a key focus on quality learning and teaching in the academic environment. The College consistently tops the secondary schools in the diocese for academic achievement, particularly in the HSC examinations.

Students follow the curriculum enforced by the New South Wales Education Standards Authority (NESA). As a systemic Catholic secondary school in the Roman Catholic Diocese of Wollongong, all students must study the Religious Education curriculum developed by the diocese.

Junior School 
In Years 7-10, all students must complete mandatory study in the core curriculum comprising:

 English
 Mathematics
 Science
 Catholic Studies
 Human Society and Its Environment (Australian History and Geography)
 Personal Development, Health and Physical Education

Stage 4 (Years 7-8) 
In Stage 4, students also complete mandatory study in:

 Technology: Food, Industrial, Graphics, and Textiles Technology (Year 7 and 8)
 Creative and Performing Arts: Music (Year 7) and Visual Arts (Year 8)
Languages: Spanish or Italian (Year 8)

Stage 5 (Years 9-10) 
In Stage 5 (Years 9-10), students have the opportunity to select two electives per year in addition to the core curriculum. Catholic Studies is a mandatory elective course. Elective courses include specific subjects in the Technologies, HSIE, CAPA, Languages and PDHPE key learning areas, which are completed as 1000 hour/200 hour courses in Years 9 and 10 respectively. These include:

 Technology: Information Software Technology (IST), iSTEM, and all major strands of mandatory technologies
 HSIE: Commerce, History and Geography Elective
 CAPA: Music, Visual Arts, Drama
 PDHPE: Child Studies, Physical Activity and Sports Studies (PASS)

Senior School 
In Senior school, students will undertake either an ATAR or Non-ATAR pattern of study. In Stage 6, all courses are selected by the student based on their interest and capacities. At the end of Semester 1 of Year 10, students will receive an eligibility criteria for all courses offered at the College based on their Semester 1 academic results and effort grades to inform their subject selection decisions, as there are grade prerequisites for entry into certain HSC courses.

For example, students wishing to study Mathematics Advanced in Stage 6 must be attaining a grade B or above in Stage 5.3 Mathematics by Semester 1 of Year 10.

In Stage 6 (Years 11-12), students must complete mandatory study in the core curriculum comprising:

 Choice of Studies of Religion (SOR I or II, ATAR), or Studies in Catholic Thought (SICT, Non-ATAR)
 Choice of English Studies (Non-ATAR), English Standard, English Advanced, or English Extension
 English Extension II is offered to eligible students in Year 12.
Students must study 12 units during the preliminary HSC (Year 11) and at least 10 units during the HSC (Year 12).

There are also number of Category B courses offered to senior students, as well as VET and TVET courses for students pursuing a non-ATAR pathway.

Co-curricular
The College offers a number of co-curricular activities in a range of disciplines. These include, but are not limited to:

Mount Carmel Oratory Society
 College choir
 College band
 Revelation - social justice and mission team
 Mount Carmel Youth Network (MCYN)
Australian Mathematics Competition
Science Competition
LIVE festival & LIVE nights
Polynesian dance team 
MISA dance team
MISA sport
WSU Fast Forward
Ignite - Student Magazine
College musicals

A number of senior students also take part in the annual immersions to work in underprivileged communities. There are currently two immersions: The Philippines immersion takes place during the summer holidays in January, and the Thailand immersion takes place during the school year.

In 2018, the College began offering an iSTEM elective for Stage 5. Mount Carmel has also started to implement a number of STEM-based learning opportunities.

College life

House System 
Students at Mount Carmel are placed into one of four houses which they will remain in for the entirety of the junior school (Years 7-10). The houses compete with one another to attain house points through sporting events, carnivals, extracurricular and academic involvement, social justice and a number of other activities. The house with the most points at the conclusion of the school year is awarded the House Cup. Houses are led by House Coordinators.

 Murray House: Red house, named after William Edward Murray, former Bishop of Wollongong.

 Howard House: Blue house, named after Charles Howard, Superior General of the Marist Brothers from 1985-1993.

 Avila House: Yellow house, named after Teresa of Ávila, Carmelite nun and Roman Catholic saint.

 MacKillop House: Green house, named after Mary MacKillop, Australia's first saint.

Pastoral Care 
The College is divided into two schools. The junior school comprises students in Years 7–10, and the senior school comprises students in Years 11 and 12. The uniform is unique to both schools. Senior students' homerooms are located in the senior buildings (B and C block), towards the top of the school. Year 7 is located in D block, Year 8 is located in E block, Year 9 is located in F, G, H and I blocks, and Year 10 is located in J block.

The junior school follows a horizontal system in which students are placed in pastoral classes (homerooms) with their own year group. The senior school has mixed pastoral classes, comprising students from Years 11 and 12. Each of these homeroom are led under the direction of a pastoral advisor, who is responsible for their class' pastoral care. Each year group is led by a Year Coordinator.

Spirituality and Social Justice 
Mount Carmel is shaped by both the Marist and Carmelite charisms, creating a unique Catholic identity. Our Lady of Mount Carmel Parish serves the local Catholic community and is located adjacent to the College grounds at 193 St Andrews Road, Varroville. The Parish Priest and College Chaplain is Father Shane Kelleher, OCD. St Marcellin Champagnat, founder of the Marist Brothers, is the patron saint of Mount Carmel.

The Mount Carmel community celebrates a number of Marist and Carmelite occasions, such as the Feast of St Marcellin Champagnat on 6 June (colloquially known as 'Champagnat Day') and the Feast of Our Lady of Mount Carmel on 16 July.

As part of this Catholic identity, the community also joins together at formal gatherings to recite the Suub Tuum, a traditional Catholic hymn, in Latin. It is of great significance to Marist communities worldwide. Students are also encouraged to partake in numerous religious and spirituality opportunities throughout the school year, both at the College and in the wider community. A number of social justice opportunities are also available. For instance, Mount Carmel holds an annual recycling competition, and the most successful house receives the Sustainability Cup.

Students also have the opportunity to be involved in a number of youth ministry experiences facilitated by Catholic Youth Ministry Diocese of Wollongong(CYMW). Spirituality at Mount Carmel is overseen by the Youth Ministry and Religious Education Coordinators.

Leadership 
All students at Mount Carmel are encouraged to participate in leadership opportunities. Pastoral classes and year groups may elect to have class captains.

Year 10 students may become House Captains. Each house has four captains, two house and two vice, selected from a pool of candidates the year prior by way of preferential voting. Following a selection process involving interviews and speeches, the entire house votes for their preferred candidates.

Year 11 students may elect to become Youth Ministry Leaders (YMLs). They work closely with the College Youth Ministry coordinator and CYMW.

Year 11 students also undergo a leadership process to determine the Student Representative Council at the commencement of Year 12 in Term 4. This includes the College Captains, Vice Captains, and a number of other positions when they are in Year 12.

School Spirit 
The school prayer is recited at the beginning of the week. This, along with the school song, are important parts of the College's identity.

Students who exhibit school spirit are presented with the prestigious Champagnat Award. This award is presented in four distinct levels, which are presented annually as part of Champagnat Day celebrations. It recognises students who embody the qualities of St Marcellin and the Mount Carmel spirit every day.

 Bronze: Awarded to students between years 8 and 10.
 Silver: Awarded to Senior Students in years 11 and 12 who have not previously received a bronze award.
 Gold: Awarded to Senior Students who have received at least one bronze award or silver award.
 Platinum: Introduced in 2013, this is awarded to students who show exemplary attitude and who are committed to the school on a day to day basis.

Celebrations 
Yearly celebrations and important festivities include:

 House days (Term 1 - Murray, Term 2 - Howard, Term 3 - MacKillop, Term 4 - Avila)
 Champagnat Day (Term 2, around the Feast of St Marcellin)
 Our Lady of Mount Carmel Feast Day (Term 3, July)
 End of Year Celebrations (Last day of the year): Mass, Celebration of Learning Assembly & Concert

Sport 
Mount Carmel has a strong sporting tradition and culture. It is a member school of the Macarthur Independent Schools Association (MISA) and competes weekly against independent schools in the area, fostering a sense of school pride. All students are expected to participate in the College's recreational sports program from Year 7-10, and may elect to participate in senior school, which is held on Tuesdays for two periods before dismissal. Mount Carmel also offers pathways for students to progress into New South Wales Combined Catholic Colleges (NSWCCC), Diocesan and Representative (regional, state, etc.) pathways. Sport is overseen by the Sports Coordinator.

Sports carnivals are key events on the College calendar. Students participate in three major carnivals throughout the school year: swimming, athletics and cross country.

Alumni 
Following the success of the College’s 30 Year Celebrations through 2015 and 2016, the Mount Carmel Catholic College Alumni was initiated. The establishment of the Alumni has resulted from the strong sense of family and community that is part of the Marist charism and which forms the fabric of the College.

Facilities

Classrooms 
Mount Carmel has a large campus with a number of buildings. It is built in a clock formation around the quadrangle, with A block at the top of the school. From 2019, each building was assigned a specific subject for use.

A block: Industrial, Graphics and Information Technology; B block: Human Society and Its Environment (HSIE); C block: Science; D block: Mathematics; E block: English; F and G block: Catholic Studies; H block: Languages; I block: Food and Textiles Technology; Upper J block: Creative and Performing Arts (CAPA); Lower J block: Personal Development, Health and Physical Education (PDHPE); K block and Library: Science, Technology, Engineering and Mathematics (iSTEM); L block: Mixed-use demountable buildings.

La Valla Trades Skills Centre 
The La Valla Trades Skills Centre opened in 2015 and is the newest building on school grounds. The centre features state-of-the-art, modern hospitality facilities available for use to students undertaking VET and TVET courses, particularly Food Technology and Hospitality, and students studying Food Technology as part of the Technology course.

Whitfield Library 
The library was named after Jenny Whitfield who was the founding Teacher-Librarian at Mount Carmel from 1986–1999. The Whitfield Library aims to satisfy the 21st Century learning, recreational and literary needs of its information consumers through service that exceeds expectations in physical and virtual environments. Its mission is to organise and provide access to information and promote the value and joy of reading, in order to enrich the lives of the people of the Mount Carmel community.

After a renovation in early 2017, the library was developed into a 'resource centre'. The library will now house IT/tech support at the College. At present it contains the Bookroom (textbook loans), Transition and Pathways office (previously Careers office), main library, senior study area, ILC and a number of small meeting rooms. In the centre of the library is the atrium, a covered outdoor study area, with the statue of St Marcellin Champagnat. Outside of the library is the Marian Statue, often used by the Rosary group for gatherings to pray the rosary.

Champagnat Centre 
The Champagnat Centre is the main hall used at Mount Carmel. The College gathers in the hall to celebrate mass, participate in assemblies, awards ceremonies and other whole school events. It is also utilised as a gymnasium for various sporting activities such as basketball, futsal and volleyball.  PDHPE classes also use the building for practical lessons. The hall has also been used to exhibit artworks at the College art exhibition held in December annually. A number of creative arts endeavours, such as drama, music and dance performances are also held in the Champagnat Centre. Key features include the mezzanine level, and the mural on the rear wall, illustrating the school's philosophy of 'Marcellin inspired, Christ centred' learning.

Quadrangle 
The quadrangle, known as the 'quad', is the central building of the College grounds. The canteen is located in the upper quad towards the Year 10 area, opposite the girls' bathrooms. It is a covered area consisting of a concrete paving with handball courts and benches. The area is predominantly used by Year 7 and 8 students. The quad is multipurpose, and has been used for school sport, assemblies and class activities. At dismissal, it is used as the bus departures terminal where students await afternoon buses. The bus loop is located adjacent to the quadrangle.

Marian Chapel 
The Marian Chapel is the main place of worship at Mount Carmel. It is located adjacent to the Champagnat Centre. Named in honour of Mary, mother of Jesus, as an homage to the College's Carmelite charism, it is used for gatherings of small crowds, liturgies, silent prayer and reflection.

Sporting Facilities 
Mount Carmel has a number of sporting facilities available to allow for various sporting activities.

Sports Office: Students may contact the sport coordinator via the sports office, located adjacent to the administration block near H block.
Gymnasium: The school gymnasium is located on the right side of the administration building. It was funded by the P&F association and is used for PDHPE classes and recreational sport. It contains a number of new fitness and exercise equipment.
Hall: The Champagnat Centre is used for a number of indoor sports, such as hockey, basketball, netball and table tennis.
School ovals: Mount Carmel has large ovals at the front of the school, near the front gates. These ovals are used predominantly for sporting, and have football posts installed. Students may play recreational sports or sit on the oval during break times. They are also used for cross country, athletics, football and soccer training.
Volleyball and Basketball/Netball Courts: The basketball/netball courts are newly refurbished and may be used by students during break times. They are fenced off from the pavement directly outside. Beside the basketball/netball court is the volleyball court, a grassed area with four nets installed.

Associated Colleges 
Mount Carmel is associated with other Catholic Colleges in the Macarthur region of the Roman Catholic Diocese of Wollongong.

 John Therry Catholic High School, Rosemeadow
 St Gregory's College, Campbelltown
 St Patrick's College, Campbelltown
 Magdalene Catholic College, Narellan
 St Benedict's Catholic College, Oran Park
 St Francis Catholic College, Edmondson Park
The College is also associated with other member schools of the Macarthur Independent Schools Association (MISA).

Notable alumni 

 Jeffrey HuntAustralian representative to the 2012 Olympics in athletics
 Shannon McDonnellNRL fullback
 Nick Shipley- AFL Footballer
 Cameron James Nixon - Two time Australian caterer of the year

References

External links
 Mount Carmel High School website

Catholic secondary schools in New South Wales
Association of Marist Schools of Australia
Educational institutions established in 1985
1985 establishments in Australia